Greatest Hits is a compilation of Bob Welch songs from his first four albums, which were released when he was signed to Capitol Records.

Track listing

 "Sentimental Lady"
 "Ebony Eyes"
 "Precious Love"
 "Hot Love, Cold World"
 "Church"
 "Come Softly To Me"
 "The Girl Can't Stop"
 "Spanish Dancers"
 "3 Hearts"
 "Jealous"

Personnel 

Bob Welch : Vocals, Guitar

Production

Various Producers

References

1994 greatest hits albums
Bob Welch (musician) albums
Curb Records compilation albums